Mount Ousley is a residential suburb situated on the foothills of Mount Keira about four kilometres northwest from the city of Wollongong, New South Wales, Australia. It is also the name of the road which crosses the nearby Illawarra Escarpment and is adjacent to the University of Wollongong. Mount Ousley has a public school, Mount Ousley Public School.

References

Suburbs of Wollongong